Doki Doki or doki-doki is a term for the sound of a beating heart in Japanese sound symbolism.

Doki doki or variants may also refer to:

Film, anime, and manga 
 Doki-Doki (short film) (2003), by Chris Eska
 DokiDoki! PreCure (2013), a Toei anime
 Doki Doki Wildcat Engine (2000), a Doraemons anime
 Doki Doki School Hours, a Tamami Momose manga and anime
 Doki Doki Densetsu: Mahoujin Guruguru (2000), an anime based on Magical Circle Guru Guru
 A manga-oriented imprint of French comics house Bamboo Édition

Music
 "Dokki Doki! Love Mail" (2001), a song by Aya Matsuura
 "Doki Doki Morning" (2011), a song by Babymetal
 An informal name for Mitsukuni Haninozuka's theme song from Ouran High School Host Club
 "Doki Doki" (1995), a song by Judy and Mary

Video games
 Doki Doki Majo Shinpan! (2007), a Nintendo DS video game
 Doki Doki Penguin Land (1985), a Sega video game
 Doki-Doki Universe (2013), a PlayStation video game
 Doki Doki Literature Club! (2017), a visual novel by Team Salvato
 Doki! Doki! Yūenchi: Crazy Land Daisakusen (1991), a Nintendo Famicom game
 Doki Doki Panic (1987), a Famicom Disk System Video Game by Nintendo

See also
Doki (disambiguation)
 Yume Kōjō: Doki Doki Panic (1987), a Nintendo game called Super Mario Bros. 2 outside Japan
 Rec: Doki Doki Seiyū Paradise (2006), a visual novel based on the manga Rec
 Tiny Toon Adventures 3: Doki Doki Sports Festival Japanese title of Tiny Toon Adventures: Wacky Sports Challenge